Raspberry Island may refer to:

 Raspberry Island (Alaska)
 Raspberry Island (Minnesota)
 Minnesota Boat Club Boathouse on Raspberry Island
 Raspberry Island (Wisconsin)
 Raspberry Island Light